Leptoglossus clypealis, the western leaf-footed bug, is a species of leaf-footed bug in the family Coreidae. It is found in Central America and North America. In the 1980s, Hasan Bolkan discovered that the leaf-footed bug was a cause of lesions on commercially produced pistachio crops.

References

External links

 

Articles created by Qbugbot
Insects described in 1910
Anisoscelidini
Hemiptera of North America
Hemiptera of Central America